Yorkie is a chocolate bar made by Nestlé. It was originally made by York-based company Rowntree's, hence the name.

History 
In 1976, Eric Nicoli of Rowntree's spotted a gap in the confectionery market for a "manly" chocolate bar, and so the company launched Yorkie as a chunkier competitor to Cadbury's Dairy Milk. Production was at York and Norwich until 1994.

The Yorkie bar has historically been marketed towards men. From the bar's launch until 1992, the "Yorkie bar trucker" was the famous "rough, tough star" of the brand's television adverts. Another prominent ad from this period was a billboard at York railway station with the words "Welcome to" and a picture of a half unwrapped Yorkie bar. Thus the advert read "Welcome to York". Further text beneath said "Where the men are hunky and the chocolate's chunky".

In 2002, the bar's relaunch campaign made this positioning more explicit, with the addition of a wrapper tagline reading "It's not for girls!", as well as associated £3m television and print advertisements that featured a variety of sexist slogans. One of these campaigns provoked 97 complaints to the Advertising Standards Agency on grounds of sexism in its first year, but the ASA eventually ruled that these complaints were not justified. However, an associated promotional campaign in which free sample bars were handed out exclusively to men was banned by Liverpool's and Birmingham's councils. In 2006, a pink-wrapped special edition was released as an ironic play on the "not for girls" branding, with this edition marketed towards women. In 2011, the 'It's Not for Girls!' slogan was dropped, and standard Yorkie bars became available in 3 packs.

Aside from the original milk chocolate bar, several variants are available, including a "raisin and biscuit" flavour, "honeycomb" flavour, and Yorkie Ice Cream. A special version for use in Ministry of Defence ration packs was also produced, with its tagline reading It's not for civvies.

Size changes 
The wrapping was later switched to a single plastic foil wrapper. More recently, in an effort to reduce costs, the number of chunks has been reduced to five with "Yorkie" moulded into each chunk. The weight of the bar has decreased over the years. Yorkie King size bars have also reduced in size.

Flavours 

Original (milk chocolate)
Raisin & Biscuit
Honeycomb
Orange ('Limited Edition' launched on 10 May 2021)
Peanut (discontinued, relaunched as a 'Limited Edition' on 13 October 2014, now discontinued again.)
Almond (discontinued)
"The Nutter" (mixed nuts – discontinued)
Yorkie Blue Ice (crunchy mint flavoured chips – discontinued)
Yorkie Hot Stuff Hot Rum (rum flavour Christmas limited edition)
Biscuit (biscuit made with Yorkie original chocolate)
Yorkie Pro (Protein chocolate with crispy pieces – protein: 24.7 g per 100 g / 10.5 g per serving)

Other information 
Yorkie sponsored the Stealth roller coaster at Thorpe Park.

See also 

 Nestlé Milk Chocolate
 Carlos V (chocolate bar)
 Cadbury Dairy Milk

Further reading

References

External links 

 

Rowntree's brands
Products introduced in 1976
Chocolate bars
Nestlé brands
British confectionery
Brand name confectionery